Marco Beccaro (born 25 November 1989) is an Italian professional footballer who plays as a midfielder for Luparense.

Club career
Beccaro started his senior career for Serie D club Albignasego. 

In 2016, he joined Mestre and won the promotion to Serie C in the first season. Beccaro made his Serie C debut on 27 August 2017 against Teramo.

On 19 June 2018, he joined Triestina, playing two seasons on this club.

On 9 January 2020, he signed with Südtirol. On 5 July 2022, Beccaro's contract with Südtirol was terminated by mutual consent.

On 18 July 2022, Beccaro returned to Luparense in Serie D.

References

External links
 
 

1989 births
Living people
People from Camposampiero
Footballers from Veneto
Italian footballers
Association football midfielders
Serie C players
Serie D players
Eccellenza players
A.S.D. Albignasego Calcio players
S.S.D. Domegliara players
A.C. Mezzocorona players
Real Vicenza V.S. players
A.C. Mestre players
U.S. Triestina Calcio 1918 players
F.C. Südtirol players
Sportspeople from the Province of Padua